Shingo Japanese Remix Album is an album of songs by the southern California punk rock band The Vandals remixed and re-interpreted by Japanese DJ Shingo Asari, released in 2005 by Kung Fu Records. Asari had been tinkering with Vandals songs for several years and had sent several of his remixes to Kung Fu, who had posted them on their website for Vandals fans to download. The band was impressed by his takes on their songs and used a remixed medley he had made of many of their most popular songs as an introduction to their live shows. Finally in 2005 Shingo was given license to remix several newer Vandals songs and to release them as an album through Kung Fu.

All of the songs presented are remixes of songs from the Vandals' two most recent albums, Internet Dating Superstuds and Hollywood Potato Chip. However, "hidden" at the end of the album is an unlisted track which is a remixed medley of many of the band's most popular songs from the 1990s.

Track listing

Personnel
Dave Quackenbush – vocals
Warren Fitzgerald – guitar, backing vocals
Joe Escalante – bass, backing vocals
Josh Freese – drums
Shingo Asari – DJ, remixing

Album information
Record label: Kung Fu Records
All songs remixed and produced by Shingo Asari
Original songs produced by Warren Fitzgerald
Mastered by Jon St. James
All songs copyright 2005 by Puppety Frenchman Music, SEAC
Art direction and illustrations by Tony Vitali

The Vandals albums
2005 remix albums
Kung Fu Records remix albums